Richrath may refer to:
Richrath (locality), locality in Langenfeld, Germany
Gary Richrath (1949–2015), American guitarist